Taylor Glockner (born 30 July 1991) is an Australian actor. Shortly after graduating from the Film and Television Studio International, he was cast as Boges in the television miniseries Conspiracy 365. From 2013 to 2014, Glockner played Mason Turner in the soap opera Neighbours. After leaving Neighbours, Glockner had a recurring role in the television series Mako: Island of Secrets from 2015 until 2016.

Early life
Taylor Glockner was born in Brisbane. He attended Anglican Church Grammar School and then the Queensland University of Technology, where he deferred a business studies course to join the full-time acting program at the Film and Television Studio International in West End. Glockner graduated in May 2011.

Career
Two weeks after graduating from drama school, Glockner was cast as Boges in the television miniseries Conspiracy 365, based on Gabrielle Lord's novels. He initially auditioned for the role of Callum Ormond, but lost the part to Harrison Gilbertson. However, Glockner impressed the casting agents and they rewrote the part of Boges around him. Glockner stayed with his aunt in Melbourne, while filming for Conspiracy 365. Glockner also made a guest appearance in ABC2's The Strange Calls, and The Elephant Princess.

In November 2012, Glockner joined the cast of Neighbours in the regular role of Mason Turner. Glockner had previously auditioned for guest roles on the show, before the producers decided that they wanted to develop a long-term character specifically for him. Glockner told Brooke Hunter from Femail that former Neighbours cast member Guy Pearce was one of his main reasons for auditioning for the show, as Pearce is his inspiration. Glockner had a two-year contract with Neighbours, but on 3 December 2013, it was announced that Glockner was to leave the show. Both the producers and Glockner – who had shot nearly 1,000 scenes in one year – felt the character of Mason needed a rest. Glockner did not rule out a return to Neighbours in the future.

In May 2014, it was announced that Glockner had been cast in the upcoming independent film No Two Snowflakes, directed by Ron V. Brown. Glockner plays Finn in the film. He told Daniel Kilkelly from Digital Spy that he was in Brisbane for another role when he learned about the film. He was asked to send in a self-tape and he then flew to Melbourne to meet with the producers. Glockner appeared in the second season of Mako: Island of Secrets, and reprised his role in season three. 

After returning to Brisbane from Los Angeles, where he had been auditioning for shows, Glockner formed the production company Calligram Pictures with filmmakers Noah Gerometta, Izac Brodrick, Jackson Kanaris and Jack Murphy. The company has produced the short film Flesh and Ivory and created the feature film Bloom, which Glockner also appears in. Glockner has also teamed up with his former Neighbours co-star Alan Fletcher to option a book for a miniseries called The Queenslander''.

Filmography

References

External links

Male actors from Brisbane
Living people
1991 births
21st-century Australian male actors
Australian male soap opera actors